Warnsveld is a town in the eastern Netherlands, about 2 km east of Zutphen.

History 
The first mention of the village in writing is from the year 1121 as Wansveld, and means "field of Warin or Warni (person)". Warnsveld developed in the Middle Ages along the Berkel.

Warnsveld's  (Church of Saint Martin) has a tower from around 1100. In the 15th century, both the church and tower were enlarged. The church was restored between 1954 and 1957, and the 19th century modifications were undone.

The former havezate 't Velde was first mentioned in 1326. Shortly after 1535 it redesigned in early Renaissance style. It was extensively modified and enlarged in 1701. It is nowadays used by the police academy.

Warnsveld was home to 505 people in 1840. In 1841, the road between Zutphen and Lochem was paved, and estates were built along the road.

Warnsveld was a separate municipality until 2005, when it was merged with Zutphen. The former municipality had a population of about 9,000, and covered both the village of Warnsveld and nearby Warken.

People born in Warnsveld
 Richard Constant Boer (1863-1929), linguist
 Gert Holstege (born 1948), neuroscientist
 Ellen ten Damme (born 1967), singer & actor
 Anne-Wil Lucas-Smeerdijk (born 1975), politician
 Jan Werle (born 1984), chess player Grandmaster
 Thijs van Amerongen (born 1986), cyclo-cross cyclist

People died in Warnsveld
 Ida Gerhardt (1905-1997), poet
 Philip Kouwen (1922-2002), artist

Gallery

References

Municipalities of the Netherlands disestablished in 2005
Populated places in Gelderland
Former municipalities of Gelderland
Zutphen